Wizards' World is a role-playing game published by Fantasy Worlds Unlimited in 1983.

Description
Wizards' World is a fantasy system.

Publication history
Wizards' World was designed by David Silvera and Douglas S. Krull, and published by Fantasy Worlds Unlimited in 1983 as an 80-page book.

Reception
Lawrence Schick described the game: "Fantasy system heavily inspired by D&D and set in a saccharin fantasy world where the worst you can say about the monsters is that they're naughty. The main city is such a terrible place it's called 'Mousehole.' The rulebook is printed sideways in a barely legible 'script' typeface."

References

Fantasy role-playing games
Role-playing games introduced in 1983